Chomedey may refer to
Chomedey, Quebec, a former city that is now a district of the city of Laval, Quebec
Paul Chomedey de Maisonneuve, the founder of Ville-Marie (now Montreal, Quebec)
Chomedey (electoral district), a provincial electoral district in Quebec, Canada